The Shaolin Drunken Monk is a 1981 kung fu film directed by Au Yeung Chun and Lau Ka-Liang, and produced by Ocean Shores.

Plot 

After a kung-fu master is killed by his students and his wife forced into suicide, their son (Lao Chung) must run for his life. Eventually, Lao discovers a hermit who has history in Shaolin and drunken kung-fu and is taught kung-fu. To avenge his parents, Lao kidnaps the daughter of one of the men who betrayed his father in hope of luring him out. Through the process of defeating his minions Lao befriends a one-handed fighter out for similar revenge, and the daughter falls in love with Lao. Lao and the one-handed man team-up in a final battle to the death. When the fight is over the daughter commits suicide in grievance of her father's past deeds, death & Lao's role in them both.

Cast
Gordon Liu as Lau Chung
Eagle Han-ying as Wong Kin Chung
Chang Mi-hee as Ying Ying
Kim Jae Woo as One armed master
Chin Yuet-San as Yashiro
Kwon Il Soo as Master Chung
Hyun Kil Soo as Lau Chung`s old master

External links

1981 films
Hong Kong martial arts films
Kung fu films
1981 martial arts films
1980s Hong Kong films